R550 road may refer to:
 R550 road (Ireland)
 R550 road (South Africa)